During the 2007–08 English football season, Southampton F.C. competed in the Football League Championship.

Season summary
In the 2007–08 season, the Saints initially had an unremarkable campaign, with the club in mid-table for the first half of the campaign. Once again though, Southampton experienced a major loss of form in the spring, not helped by managerial instability caused by the resignation of George Burley followed by caretaker spells by John Gorman and then Nigel Pearson, and were left in serious danger of relegation to League One on the last day of the season. However, a win combined with some other favourable results ensured their survival for another season in the Championship.

Final league table

Results
Southampton's score comes first

Legend

Football League Championship

FA Cup

League Cup

Squad

Left club during season

References

Southampton F.C. seasons
Southampton F.C.